The Höttur men's basketball team, commonly known as Höttur, is the men's basketball department of the Icelandic multi-sport club Íþróttafélagið Höttur.

Recent history
Höttur first achieved promotion to the top-tier Úrvalsdeild karla in 2005, after beating Valur in the 1. deild karla promotion finals. It finished last in the 2005–2006 Úrvalsdeild, with 3 victories in 22 games, and was relegated back to 1. deild karla. The team won 1. deild karla and was promoted to the Úrvalsdeild again in 2015 and 2017 only to be relegated back both times. Höttur was on top when the 2019–20 season was cut short during the COVID-19 pandemic and was promoted to Úrvalsdeild karla. Despite winning 7 games, the team was relegated at the end of the 2020–21 season. On 18 May, Höttur hired Einar Árni Jóhannsson as a co-head coach alongside Viðar Örn Hafsteinsson. In 2022, the team was again promoted to the Úrvalsdeild after winning the 1. deild promotion playoffs.

Trophies and awards

Trophies
 1. deild karla:
 Winners (3): 2015, 2017, 2020

Awards

1. deild karla Coach of the Year
Viðar Örn Hafsteinsson – 2015, 2017
1. deild karla Domestic All-First team
Eysteinn Ævarsson – 2019
Hreinn Gunnar Birgisson – 2015
Mirko Stefán Virijevic – 2017
Ragnar Gerald Albertsson – 2017

Notable past players

References

Basketball teams in Iceland